Mandie is a series of children's books.

Mandie may also refer to:

 Philip Mandie (born 1942), judge of the Supreme Court of Victoria
 Mandie Fletcher (born 1954), British television and film director
 Mandie Godliman (born 1973), English former cricketer
 Mandie Landry, American politician
 A nickname for the recreational drug Methaqualone

See also
 Mandle, surname
 Mandy (disambiguation)